A by-election for the seat of Canterbury in the New South Wales Legislative Assembly was held on 28 July 1900 because the Elections and Qualifications Committee declared that the election of Sydney Smith, with a margin of 5 votes, at the by-election in June was void because of irregularities the way the returning officer dealt with unused ballot papers and that people had voted who did not have an elector's right at the time the writ was issued.

Dates

Results

The election of Sydney Smith at the June 1900 by-election was declared void.

See also
Electoral results for the district of Canterbury
List of New South Wales state by-elections

Notes

References

1900 elections in Australia
New South Wales state by-elections
1900s in New South Wales